Michel Émile Kfoury (born September 14, 1974), known by his stage name Wael Kfoury, is a Lebanese singer, musician, songwriter, and actor.

Career
Wael studied solfège at the Holy Spirit University of Kaslik.

Commercial deals
Kfoury signed a publicity campaign deal for PepsiCo's PepsiArabia affiliate.  Kfoury was a star of PepsiCo sponsored "Bahr el Noujoum" (meaning of Sea of Stars).

In February 2009, he announced cooperation with LG Electronics for a search for future music stars.

Artist's activities

In August 2011, Wael Kfoury launched a tennis tournament that runs under his patronage and his management team. The tournament is entitled "Kfoury First In".

Personal life

Kfoury was born into a Melkite Greek Catholic family. He was married in Cyprus, in a civil ceremony, to Angela Bechara. Their relationship and marriage was kept a secret for some time from the press. The couple have a daughter named Michele, who was born September 10, 2011. Her name comes from the feminine equivalent of her father's real name Michel. Kfoury's second child and daughter Milana was born June 1, 2016. The couple separated in August 2019.

Albums
1994: Shafouha w Sarou Y'oulou
1995: Mayyet Fiki
1996: Ba'd el Sentayn
1997: Tna'shar Shaher
1998: Shubbak el Houb
1999: Hikayat 'Asheq
2000: Sa'alouni
2001: Shou Ra'yak
2003: Oumry Killo
2004: Qorb Liyya
2005: Bhebak ana ktyr
2007: Byihenn
2010: Kfoury Classic perfect
2012: Ya Dalli Ya Rou7i
2014: Al Gharam l mostahil
2017: W.

References

External links

1974 births
Living people
21st-century Lebanese male singers
Lebanese male actors
Lebanese male film actors
Lebanese male television actors
People from Zahle
Lebanese Melkite Greek Catholics
Universal Music Group artists
20th-century Lebanese male singers